Blennidus plaumanni is a species of ground beetle in the subfamily Pterostichinae. It was described by Emden in 1949.

References

Blennidus
Beetles described in 1949